Nils Fredrik Aurelius (born 1946) is a Swedish politician of the Moderate Party, member of the Riksdag in 1991, and then again 1994–2006.

References

1946 births
Living people
Members of the Riksdag from the Moderate Party
Members of the Riksdag 1988–1991
Members of the Riksdag 1994–1998
Members of the Riksdag 1998–2002
Members of the Riksdag 2002–2006
20th-century Swedish politicians
21st-century Swedish politicians